Poland competed at the 1982 European Athletics Championships in Athens, Greece, from 6-12 September 1982. A delegation of 34 athletes were sent to represent the country.

Medals

References

European Athletics Championships
1982
Nations at the 1982 European Athletics Championships